Rosa Irene Campos (born 9 February 1986) is a Mexican windsurfer. She competed in the women's Mistral One Design event at the 2004 Summer Olympics.

References

1986 births
Living people
Mexican female sailors (sport)
Mexican windsurfers
Olympic sailors of Mexico
Sailors at the 2004 Summer Olympics – Mistral One Design
Place of birth missing (living people)
Female windsurfers